Anne-Marie Dias Borges, born on 18 December 1976, in Riom, is a Franco-Cape-Verdean journalist and radio and television host.  She currently works as a Senior Broadcast Journalist and Presenter for BBC Business TV, position she has held since 2016.

Biography

Early life and education 
Anne-Marie Dias Borges was born in Riom (France) on 18 December 1976, daughter of Cape-Verdean parents from the island of Santiago. Her early years were spent between the French Alps and Nice where she attended high school at Lycée d’Etat Estienne d’Orves, on the French Riviera.

In 1997, she moved to London and obtained in 2000 a Bachelor of Arts in African Studies at the University of London, combined with Development Studies and Portuguese and Japanese from the School of Oriental. She additionally obtained that same year syllabuses in Literature of Portuguese Africa and History of Portuguese Africa from King's College at the University of London in London, United Kingdom.

Career 
Anne-Marie began her career in 2002 at BBC Afrique radio. Recognized for her dynamic personality during her 9 years at this network, she was voted "Most popular presenter" on numerous occasions.

In 2015, she joined Africa24 TV, mostly considered as the African "CNN", in Paris, where she worked as chief information officer and TV Anchor. She notably hosted a weekly political TV debate called "Polititia", a show watched by millions of viewers.

Since 2016, Anne-Marie Dias Borges co-leads the BBC Business French TV team in London, which produces two regular TV shows: Questions d’Argent and Cash Eco (on hold due to COVID-19).

Other 

 
Anne-Marie Dias Borges has been the Master of ceremony for many relevant international conferences over the past several years, she has travelled all over the world to host events and manage campaigns. Fluent in French, English, Spanish, Portuguese and Portuguese Creole, she has provided hundreds of hours of live and pre-recorded television, radio, and conference presenting, as well as interviews with key international figures, politicians, and artists, most notably Ngozi Okonjo-Iweala, the first woman and the first African to be chosen as Director-General of the World Trade Organization (WTO), Wamkele Keabetswe Mene, Secretary General of the African Continental Free Trade Area (AfCFTA), Jean-Pierre Bemba, the former vice-President of the Democratic Republic of Congo and Senegalese artist and activist, Youssou N’dour.

In April 2021, she hosted the High-Level Virtual Dialogue on Feeding Africa event, a dialogue organized by the African Development Bank under the theme "Leadership to scale up successful innovations" and which seventeen heads of state, governments and multilateral institutions attended.

Philanthropic 
In 2010 and 2011, she has organized two successful anti-drugs campaigns in Cabo Verde, in partnership with the government and the United Nations. One of the highlights of the last campaign was the release of a popular song "Ka bo usa" ("Don’t use"), which she co-wrote with Cape-Verdean Award-winning artist Johnny Ramos.

Personal life 
Anne-Marie Dias Borges is resident in England, United Kingdom.

Awards and recognition 
 2020 : 100 Most influential african Women in Africa (Avance Media)
 2020 : 500 Africadoers (Tropics Magazine)
 2021 : Top 20 Inspirational Women of the African Diaspora Professional Women in Europe (ADIPWE), ranked sixth.

Notable events

References

External links 

 Anne-Marie Dias Borges on Twitter

Alumni of the University of London
21st-century French journalists
French women journalists
Women war correspondents
French television executives
French television talk show hosts
French television journalists
French television presenters
French political journalists
French journalists
21st-century British journalists
1976 births
Living people
21st-century French women